Thomas Howard Fitnam (August 19, 1854 – April 5, 1919) was an American attorney who was one of the first law clerks to the justices of the Supreme Court of the United States, serving Chief Justice Melville Fuller from 1888 to 1889.

In 1854, Fitnam was born in Washington, D.C., to Rosella Dant and Thomas Fitnam, a harness maker. As a young man, Fitnam Jr. worked as a plasterer and printer. In June 1884, at age 30 Fitnam graduated from Georgetown University with a LL.B., where he won a prize for his essay. He continued his post-graduate studies at Georgetown, receiving his LL.M. in 1885. In 1885, he worked as a pressman for the United States Government Printing Office. After clerking for the Supreme Court, Fitnam engaged in private practice and was an examiner and trustee in the Equity Court in Washington, D.C.

Fitnam died in Washington, D.C., on April 5, 1919.

See also
 List of law clerks of the Supreme Court of the United States (Chief Justice)
 Clarence M. York
 Everett Riley York
 James S. Harlan 
 Thomas A. Russell
 Frederick Emmons Chapin

References

1854 births
1919 deaths
19th-century American lawyers
20th-century American lawyers
Georgetown University Law Center alumni
Law clerks of the Supreme Court of the United States
Lawyers from Washington, D.C.